Camillo Cibin (3 June 1926 – 25 October 2009) was a Papal bodyguard and Inspector General of the Corpo della Gendarmeria, the security and police force of Vatican City. He retired in 2006 after 58 years of service in the security force, and over 40 years as its commander. He served as a bodyguard to six popes.

Early life and career
Cibin was born at Salgareda, in the northern province of Treviso in Italy, on 3 June 1926. He joined the Vatican police force at age 21. He began serving in charge of security at the Vatican Council in the 1960s. He was appointed inspector-general of the Vatican Gendarmerie in 1972.

Pope John Paul II Assassination attempt
Cibin was with Pope John Paul II when the pontiff was shot in St. Peter's Square in 1981. Cibin captured Mehmet Ali Ağca, who was convicted of the assassination attempt and spent 19 years in an Italian prison. A year later, Cibin prevented Juan María Fernández y Krohn from stabbing the pontiff during his visit to Fatima.

Death and funeral
Cibin died at 83 of natural causes. His funeral mass was performed in St. Peter's Square in the Vatican City.

References 

1926 births
2009 deaths
Vatican City police officers
Attempted assassination of Pope John Paul II
Chiefs of police
Bodyguards